Lasiococca brevipes, synonym Lasiococca malaccensis, is a species of flowering plant in the family Euphorbiaceae, native to the Lesser Sunda Islands, Peninsular Malaysia, the Philippines, and Sulawesi. It was first described by Elmer Drew Merrill in 1915 as Mallotus brevipes.

Conservation
Lasiococca malaccensis was assessed as "vulnerable" in the 1998 IUCN Red List, where it is said to be native only to Peninsular Malaysia. , L. malaccensis was regarded as a synonym of Lasiococca brevipes, which has a wider distribution.

References

Acalypheae
Flora of the Lesser Sunda Islands
Flora of Malaya
Flora of the Philippines
Flora of Sulawesi
Plants described in 1915